Pirkkala is a municipality of Finland. Pirkkala is also currently the fastest-growing municipality in the Pirkanmaa region. The municipality is unilingually Finnish.

Tampere-Pirkkala Airport is located in southwest Pirkkala. The most significant main road in Pirkkala is Tampere Ring Road.

History

Great Pirkkala
The former parish of Suur-Pirkkala (Great Pirkkala) is mentioned in historical writings from the 14th century. It occupied over half of Pirkanmaa, a region nowadays populated by about 526,000 inhabitants. Suur-Pirkkala began to split when new parishes and municipalities were founded and wanted independence.

South and North Pirkkala
In 1922 the Pirkkala was split into Pohjois- (Northern) and Etelä-Pirkkala (Southern Pirkkala) due to a movement in Southern Pirkkala led by agronomist Hannes Palmroth of the Partola Estate to gain independence from the more industrial North.

Pirkkala
In 1938 the name of Northern Pirkkala was changed to Nokia and after an appeal to the President of Finland Kyösti Kallio in 1939, Southern Pirkkala reverted to its original name Pirkkala. The present-day province of Pirkanmaa that was founded in the 1950s is named after Pirkkala as it was in the center of the region that was more or less the same area as the historic Great Pirkkala

Sights
Pirkkala has been inhabited by the Stone Age and Iron Age, and many ancient finds have been made in the area.

The red-brick old church was designed by Ilmari Launis in 1921, and it is known that it was built on the site of the old Pirkkala parish church. The white new church from 1994, designed by Simo Paavilainen and Käpy Paavilainen, is located near the current town center, Naistenmatka. In its year of completion, the church, which has a modern appearance, was chosen as the most beautiful new building in Finland.

The Sculpture Park has been formed near the municipal center from the works of art of the international cast iron symposia of 2001 and 2003. It consists of sculptures of contemporary art, which are mostly placed around Lake Vähäjärvi. The idea of the cast iron symposiums is Villu Jaaniso, an artist from Pirkkala who moved from Estonia to Finland. Other materials were used in the 2003 event. Perhaps the most prominent of the sights is the Jaaniso's Peruspirkkalalainen statue on the edge of the Suupantori market square in the town center, or the Valte statue according to its model.

Notable people

International relations

Twin towns — Sister cities
Pirkkala is twinned with:
 Solna, Sweden

Gallery

See also
 Birkarls

References

External links

Municipality of Pirkkala – official site

 
Populated places established in 1922